Born to Fight (Gerd ma lui) is a 1984 Thai martial arts action film directed by Panna Rittikrai in his directorial debut.

Plot
Sianfong is a lawyer working for a crime family in Hong Kong. He acquires evidence that his wealthy client's devious son-in-law Tungseung has been stealing money from the family. Tungseung sends a deadly gang of martial artists known as the Green Dragons to silence Sianfong, who flees to Thailand. A Thai cop and martial artist named Tong searches for the lawyer to have him returned alive to Hong Kong, fighting off gang members along the way.

Cast
Panna Rittikrai as Tong
Hernfah Khwangmhek as Siafong

Remake

Sahamongkol Film International produced a name-only remake of the film directed by Panna Rittikrai in 2004. It stars Dan Chupong and involves terrorists launching nuclear missiles from a small border village.

References

External links

1984 films
1984 action films
1984 martial arts films
Sahamongkol Film International films
Thai-language films
Muay Thai films
Thai Muay Thai films
Films about police officers
1980s police procedural films
1984 directorial debut films